The United States competed at the 1924 Summer Olympics in Paris, France. 299 competitors, 275 men and 24 women, took part in 108 events in 18 sports.

Medalists

Athletics

Ninety-six athletes represented the United States in 1924. It was the nation's seventh appearance in the sport. The United States was one of three nations, along with Great Britain and Greece, to have competed in each edition of the Olympic athletics program to that point. The American team had competitors in each of the 27 events, with the maximum number of entries in all but 3 of them (the United States did not send full teams for the steeplechase, the racewalk, or the triple jump). The United States had finalists in every event except the triple jump. The team swept the medals in two events: the pole vault and the shot put.

The United States won 32 medals overall, almost twice that of the next most successful nation (Finland). The 12 gold medals won by the Americans were two more than Finland won, putting the United States at the top of the leaderboard for the sport. Houser and Osborn were the most successful individuals, with two gold medals apiece. Earl Johnson and Scholz won two medals each. Thirty-three other athletes won medals, bringing the total to 37 of 96 participants taking medals.

Ranks given are within the heat.

Boxing 

Sixteen boxers represented the United States at the 1924 Games; the U.S. was one of four countries (along with France, Great Britain, and Italy) to send two boxers in each weight class. It was the nation's third appearance in the sport. The two gold medals won by Americans matched Britain's pair of golds. The United States team won the most overall medals with six.

In two weight classes, both American boxers won medals. The featherweight final featured two Americans, with Fields coming out on top. LaBarba won the flyweight, with Fee taking the bronze in that weight class. All six medals came in the lightest four weight classes, with Tripoli's silver in the bantamweight and Boylstein's bronze in the lightweight rounding out the total.

Cycling

Five cyclists represented the United States in 1924. It was the nation's sixth appearance in the sport, matching France for most appearances.

Road cycling

Track cycling

Ranks given are within the heat.

Diving

Ten divers, five men and five women, represented the United States in 1924. It was the nation's fifth appearance in the sport; the United States was the only nation to have appeared at each Olympic diving competition to that point. The Americans were dominant, sweeping the medals in three of the five events and taking the top two places in a fourth. The United States entered three divers in each event for a total of 15 entries; 11 resulted in medals while all 15 advanced to the finals. White was the top individual diver, with gold medals in both of his events. Becker won a gold and a silver. Smith took a gold, while Pinkston took a pair of bronzes. Riggin, Fall, and Desjardins each won a silver, and Fletcher took a bronze. Thrash and Meany were the only two Americans to not win medals.

Ranks given are within the heat.

 Men

 Women

Equestrian

Five equestrians represented the United States in 1924. It was the nation's fourth appearance in the sport; the United States was the only nation to have taken part in each Olympic equestrian competition to date. Doak won the individual eventing bronze, the United States's first medal since 1912 and matching their all-time best result in the sport. Doak and Carr, who finished eighth in the eventing, gave the United States a strong shot at silver in the team competition, but neither Barry nor Padgett finished and so the team did not get a score. Padgett, this time along with Bontecou, again did not finish in the show jumping competition, and the United States did not get a score in that competition either. Barry's 25th place was the best individual result in show jumping.

Fencing

21 fencers, 19 men and 2 women, represented the United States in 1924. It was the nation's fifth appearance in the sport; the United States was one of nine nations to send women to the first Olympic women's fencing competition.

 Men

Ranks given are within the pool.

 Women

Ranks given are within the pool.

Football

The United States competed in the Olympic football tournament for the second time in 1924.

 Round 1

 Round 2

Final rank ninth

Roster:
 Aage Brix
 Sam Dalrymple
 Irving Davis
 William Demko
 Jimmy Douglas
 Henry Farrell
 William Findlay
 Edward Hart
 Raymond Hornberger
 Carl Johnson
 F. Burke Jones
 Jakes Mulholland
 Fred O'Connor
 Arthur Rudd
 Andy Straden
 Herbert Wells

Coach: George M. Collins

Gymnastics

Eight gymnasts represented the United States in 1924. It was the nation's third appearance in the sport. Kriz took the nation's only medal, with the gold in the vault.

Artistic

Modern pentathlon

Four pentathletes represented the United States in 1924. It was the nation's third appearance in the sport. The United States was one of six nations to have competed in each edition of the Olympic modern pentathlon to that point.

Polo

The United States sent a polo team to the Olympics for the third time in 1924. The Americans won their first three games, against the three European sides, and faced Argentina in their final game. Despite having a late lead, the United States was unable to finish off the Argentinians, who came from behind to beat the United States. The United States finished with the silver medal.

Ranks given are within the pool.

Rowing

20 rowers represented the United States in 1924. It was the nation's fourth appearance in the sport. All five of the American boats won medals: two golds, a silver, and a pair of bronzes.

Ranks given are within the heat.

Rugby union

The United States sent a rugby team to the Olympics for the second time in 1924. The defending champions won their first game against Romania, 37 to 0. As France had already beaten Romania, the three-team round-robin finished with the France-United States match. The Americans won 17 to 3 to become the first team to successfully defend an Olympic rugby championship.

Ranks given are within the pool.

Shooting

Twenty-one sport shooters represented the United States in 1924.

Swimming

Ranks given are within the heat.

 Men

* – Indicates athlete swam in the preliminaries but not in the final race.

 Women

Tennis

 Men

 Women

 Mixed

Water polo

In its third Olympic water polo appearance, the United States took the bronze medal.

Roster
 Arthur Austin
 Oliver Horn
 Fred Lauer
 George Mitchell
 John Norton
 Wally O'Connor
 George Schroth
 Herb Vollmer
 Johnny Weissmuller

First round

Silver medal semifinals

Silver medal final

Bronze medal quarterfinals
 Bye
Bronze medal semifinals

Bronze medal final

Wrestling

Freestyle wrestling

 Men's

Art Competitions

References

External links
Official Olympic Reports
International Olympic Committee results database
United States Olympic book

Nations at the 1924 Summer Olympics
1924
Oly